The following movies were filmed using 65mm or 70mm negative stock. Titles are followed by the photographic process(es) employed.

Releases produced in Todd-AO, Todd-70, Super Panavision 70 (also known as Panavision 70), Panavision System 65 (also known as Panavision Super 70), Dimension 150, Arri 765 and Superpanorama 70 (also known as MClS 70 and MCS Superpanorama 70) were photographed with spherical optics on 65 mm film with five perforations per frame, yielding an aspect ratio of 2.20:1.

Sovscope 70 and DEFA 70 releases were identical with the exception that they were photographed on 70 mm negative stock.

MGM Camera 65 and Ultra Panavision 70 releases employed the same film format, but the use of 1.25X anamorphic optics yielded a super-wide aspect ratio of approximately 2.75:1.

70 mm Cinerama releases were projected with special optics onto a deeply curved screen in an attempt to mimic the effect of the original 3-strip Cinerama process.

Hi Fi Stereo 70 (also known as Triarama and Stereovision 70) was a 3-D process. Two anamorphic images, one for each eye, were captured side by side on 65 mm film. A special lens on a 70 mm projector added polarization and merged the two images on the screen.  A similar Soviet system known as Stereo 70 did not employ anamorphics, resulting in an aspect ratio of 1.37:1.

Stereospace 2000 (a 3D process) and Kodak-Disney 3D used dual 65 mm cameras operating at 30fps.

Standard 70 mm theater prints were 70 mm wide, with the extra space used to accommodate the 6-channel magnetic soundtracks, consisting of five full-range channels (left, left-center, center, right-center and right) arrayed behind the screen, with the sixth channel providing surround effects.

Far and Away (1992), Baraka (1992) and Hamlet (1996) employed a modified arrangement of speakers, with left, center and right channels behind the screen, left and right surround channels and a low-frequency effects channel. More recent 70 mm releases (including The Hateful Eight) have used standard 5.1 DTS sound.

This list does not include any of the hundreds of 35 mm films which have been optically enlarged to 70 mm for deluxe exhibition, including such titles as Star Wars, Raiders of the Lost Ark, and Ghostbusters.

Also not included are 70 mm releases which originated on horizontal 35 mm negative such as Vistavision and Technirama (see List of Technirama films), nor films made in the Showscan process. For films shot in the IMAX 70mm format, see List of IMAX films.

American 65/70 mm films 
 Oklahoma! (1955) – Todd-AO @ 30 frame/s; this production also shot in 35 mm CinemaScope @ 24 frame/s
 Around the World in 80 Days (1956) – Todd-AO; shot twice, with cameras running at 30 and 24 frame/s, respectively
 Raintree County (1957) – MGM Camera 65; exhibited only in 35 mm CinemaScope since all the 70 mm cinemas were booked
 South Pacific (1958) – Todd-AO
 Ben-Hur (1959) – MGM Camera 65
 Porgy and Bess (1959) – Todd-AO
 The Big Fisherman (1959) – Super Panavision 70
 Scent of Mystery (1960) – Todd-70 and Smell-O-Vision. Todd-Belock 8-channel Sound, which used a control signal to "steer" the single surround channel to three surround tracks (right wall, left wall and rear wall). This title was later re-edited, optically converted to 3-strip Cinemiracle and re-released without the odors as Holiday in Spain in 1961. It was exhibited in both Cinerama and Cinemiracle.
 Can-Can (1960) – Todd-AO
 The Alamo (1960) – Todd-AO
 Exodus (1960) – Super Panavision 70
 West Side Story (1961) –  Panavision 70
 Mutiny on the Bounty (1962) – Ultra Panavision 70
 It's a Mad, Mad, Mad, Mad World (1963) – Ultra Panavision 70; shown in 70 mm Cinerama
 Cleopatra (1963) – Todd-AO (shooting started in CinemaScope, changed to 3-panel Cinerama and finally to Todd-AO.  The anamorphic and 3-panel footage was discarded.)
 The Fall of the Roman Empire (1964) – Ultra Panavision 70
 My Fair Lady (1964) – Super Panavision 70
 Cheyenne Autumn (1964) – Super Panavision 70
 The Sound of Music (1965) – Todd-AO (second unit photography [aerial shots] in Superpanorama 70)
 Those Magnificent Men in Their Flying Machines (1965) – Todd-AO (some scenes in Superpanorama 70)
 The Agony and the Ecstasy (1965) – Todd-AO
 The Greatest Story Ever Told (1965) – Ultra Panavision 70; shown in 70 mm Cinerama
 The Hallelujah Trail (1965) – Ultra Panavision 70; shown in 70 mm Cinerama
 Battle of the Bulge (1965) – Ultra Panavision 70; shown in 70 mm Cinerama
 Lord Jim (1965) – Super Panavision 70
 Khartoum (1966) – Ultra Panavision 70; shown in 70 mm Cinerama
 Grand Prix (1966) – Super Panavision 70 (some scenes in Superpanorama 70); shown in 70 mm Cinerama
 The Bible: In The Beginning (1966) – Dimension 150 (credited as D-150)
 Doctor Dolittle (1967) – Todd-AO
 2001: A Space Odyssey (1968) – Super Panavision 70; some shots in Todd-AO; aerial shots from the stargate sequence in Superpanorama 70. Shown in 70 mm Cinerama
 Ice Station Zebra (1968) – Super Panavision 70 (shooting started in Ultra Panavision 70 then switched to Super Panavision 70); shown in 70 mm Cinerama
 Star! (1968) – Todd-AO
 Hello, Dolly! (1969) – Todd-AO
 Krakatoa, East of Java (1969) – Todd-AO and Super Panavision 70 shown in 70 mm Cinerama
 Airport (1970) – Todd-AO
 Patton (1970) – Dimension 150
 Song of Norway (1970) – Super Panavision 70, shown in 70 mm Cinerama, advertised as "On the Cinerama screen" in some countries
 The Last Valley (1970) – Todd-AO (made for 70 mm Cinerama, but never shown in that format)
 Tron (1982) – Super Panavision 70. Live-action all filmed in color 65mm; CGI sequences filmed in 65mm B&W and composited to a VistaVision intermediate then optically printed back to 70mm IP.
 Far and Away (1992) – Panavision System 65; segments in Arri 765 and VistaVision
 Baraka (1992) – Todd-AO, documentary
 Hamlet (1996) – Panavision System 65; segments in Arri 765
 Samsara (2011) – Panavision System 65, documentary (no 70mm prints produced)
 The Hateful Eight (2015) - Ultra Panavision 70 (the first 70mm Cinerama release since 1970)

Other countries
 Lawrence of Arabia (United Kingdom 1962) – Super Panavision 70
 Flying Clipper – Traumreise unter weissen Segeln (West Germany 1962) – Superpanorama 70. A re-edited version was shown as Mediterranean Holiday (1964) in 70 mm Cinerama and in Wonderama in the USA
 Shéhérazade (France/Spain/Italy 1963) – Superpanorama 70
 La Tulipe noire/The Black Tulip (France/Italy/Spain 1964) – Superpanorama 70; shown in 70 mm Cinerama
 Old Shatterhand (West Germany/Yugoslavia/France/Italy 1964) – Superpanorama 70
 Onkel Toms Hütte /La Case de l'Oncle Tom/Uncle Tom's Cabin (France/Italy/West Germany/Yugoslavia 1965) – Superpanorama 70
 Der Kongress amüsiert sich/Congress of Love (West Germany/Austria 1966) – Superpanorama 70
 El Fantástico Mundo del Dr Coppelius /Dr. Coppelius (Spain/US 1966) – Superpanorama 70
 Pampa Salvaje/Savage Pampas (Spain/Argentina/US 1966) – Superpanorama 70
 Play Time (France 1967) – filmed with 65 mm Mitchell cameras, with an aperture masked for a non-standard aspect ratio of approximately 1.7:1
 Con la muerte a la espalda/With Death On Your Back (Spain/France/Italy 1967) – Hi-Fi Stereo 70
 La Marca del Hombre Lobo (Spain 1968) – Hi Fi Stereo 70. Re-edited with new footage and released in the US in 35 mm 3D as Frankenstein's Bloody Terror.
 Chitty Chitty Bang Bang (United Kingdom & USA 1968) – Super Panavision 70
 Ryan's Daughter (United Kingdom 1970) – Super Panavision 70
 Liebe in drei Dimensionen/Love in 3D (West Germany 1973) – Triarama
 Akira (Japan 1988) - Animated in 1.85:1 and photographed in 65mm.
 Map of the Human Heart (Australia/United Kingdom 1993) – Panavision System 65. Released in 35mm only.
 As Wonderland Goes By (Australia/Bulgaria 2012) - Panavision System 65
 Death on the Nile (United Kingdom & USA 2022) - Panavision System 65

70mm releases from 3-strip negative
 To Be Alive! (1964) converted from 3 x 35mm to Ultra Panavision
 Cinerama's Russian Adventure (1966) optically converted from Kinopanorama to 70 mm Cinerama
 This Is Cinerama (1972) – optically converted from Cinerama to 70 mm Cinerama

List of Short Subjects
 The Miracle of Todd-AO (USA 1956) – Todd-AO @ 30 frame/s
 The March of Todd-AO (USA 1958) – Todd-AO
 The Tale of Old Whiff (USA 1960) – Todd-70 and Smell-O-Vision. Released with Scent of Mystery. Todd-Belock 8-channel Sound, which used a control signal to "steer" the single surround channel to three surround tracks (right wall, left wall and rear wall).
 Man in the 5th Dimension (USA 1964) – Todd-AO. Shown at NYC World's Fair.
 Fortress of Peace (Switzerland 1964) – Superpanorama 70
 The Artist Who Did Not Want To Paint (USA 1964) – Todd-AO. Prologue to The Agony and the Ecstasy.
 Delifini prikhodyat k lyudyam/Dolphins Come to the People (Soviet 1966) – Kinopanorama 70. 20m short, optically converted to 3-strip Kinopanorama.
 Defa 70 (East Germany 1967) – DEFA-70 demo film
 Sky over Holland (Netherlands 1967) – Superpanorama 70
 A Place to Stand (Canada 1967). Produced for the Ontario Pavilion at Expo 67 in Montreal. Winner of the Best Live Action Short Subject Oscar at the 1968 Academy Awards.
 Multiple Man (Canada 1968)
 Where the North Begins (Canada 1971)
 Festival (Canada 1971)
 Seasons of the Mind (Canada 1971)
 Probes in Space (1975) – Todd-AO. The camera was fitted with the fisheye lens used for Cinerama 360.
 Auto-E-Motion (1984) – Super Panavision 70. BMW promotional film.
 Cinespace 70 by Todd-AO (USA 1989) – Cinespace 70. A demo film to showcase the merits of filming using Todd-AO's new Cinespace 70 cameras. The negative specifications were identical to Todd-AO but the frame rate was increased to 30fps.
 Warriors of the Wasteland (USA 1989) - Super Panavision 70 (65mm camera negative was frame scanned at 4k and restored in 2014)
 Året gjennom Børfjord/A Year Along the Abandoned Road (Norway 1991) – Super Panavision 70
 Dead Sea (USA 1992) – Panavision System 65 (65mm camera negative was frame scanned at 4k and restored in 2014)
 Tour Eiffel (Germany 1994) – Arri 765
 Svalbard - Arctic Seasons (Norway 1995) – Filmed with Mitchell 65mm cameras (HKB 65/70)
 Le mariage de Fanny/Fanny's Wedding (France 2000) – Superpanorama 70
 The Testaments of One Fold and One Shepherd (USA 2000) – Arri 765 (some scenes in Panavision System 65)
 Tanakh bibelen al-quran (Norway 2007) – Superpanorama 70
 Daughter of Dismay (Austria 2019) – Mitchell 8/65 camera

Partial list of Special Venue Films
 Journey to the Stars (1962) – Cinerama 360 (a 10/70 dome system using a circular image). 24fps. Shown at the Seattle World's Fair.
 To the Moon and Beyond (1964) – Cinerama 360 (a 10/70 dome system using a circular image). 18fps. Shown in the Transportation and Travel Pavilion at the New York World's Fair. Later reduced to 35mm, renamed Cosmos and shown in a traveling inflatable theater.
 Motion (Canada 1967) – Superpanorama 70
 Harmony: Nature and Man (1969) – Dimension 150. Shown in the Washington State Pavilion at the 1970 Osaka World's Fair.
 Voyage to the Outer Planets (1973) – A multimedia presentation which included sequences filmed in standard 65mm and in Dynavision (8/70 negative using a modified Todd-AO camera, blown up to OMNIMAX).
 The Circus (1973) – Todd-AO. Shot with the camera on its side and projected onto a tall narrow screen.
 Cosmos (aka Cosmos: The Universe of Loren Eisley) (1974) – Dynavision (8/70 negative using a modified Todd-AO camera, blown up to OMNIMAX). Shown at the Reuben H. Fleet Science Center in San Diego.
 Alaska The Great Land (1981) – 70mm Omnivision (8 perf); Alaska Experience Theatre
 Symbiosis (1982) – Super Panavision 70 at 30fps. Disney Epcot short subject. Employed an unusual 12-channel sound system designed for the special theater in which it was shown.
 Magic Journeys (1982) – Kodak-Disney 3D
 Hawaii Island of the Gods (1984) – 70mm Omnivision (8 perf); Hawaii Experience Theatre.
 Water, The Source of Life (1984) – Stereospace 2000. Made for the United States Pavilion at the 1984 World's Fair in New Orleans.
 Earth Song - Erika's Dream (1985) – Stereospace 2000. Made for the 3D Fantasium exhibit of the Sumitomo Pavilion at Expo '85 in Tsukuba, Japan.
 Captain EO (1986) – Kodak-Disney 3D
 Norway – The Film (1989) – Super Panavision 70. Epcot short subject.
 Jim Henson's Muppet*Vision 3D (1991) – Dual camera 70mm 3D.
 Honey, I Shrunk the Audience! (1994) – Kodak-Disney 3D
 T2 3D: Battle Across Time (1996) – 3 x dual camera 65mm 3D @ 30fps
 The Witness (1997) – Arri 765 (some scenes in Panavision System 65); shown at Mashantucket Pequot Museum
 It's Tough to Be a Bug! (1998) – Dual camera 70mm 3D.
 100% (1999) – Arri 765. 10-minute short shown in a transportable theatre at NASCAR races.

Films partially shot in 65 mm
 How the West Was Won (1962) – Ultra Panavision 70 (some action scenes and shots requiring rear projection, optically converted to 3 strip Cinerama through special printer. The bulk was shot in 3 strip Cinerama.)
 Az aranyfej/The Golden Head (1965) – Chase sequence filmed in Superpanorama 70; the bulk was shot in Super Technirama 70. Shown in 70 mm Cinerama.
 Mackenna's Gold (1969) – Super Panavision 70
 The Horsemen (1971) – Super Panavision 70
 Close Encounters of the Third Kind (1977) – Super Panavision 70 - special effects shots only. (Early promotional material erroneously suggested that the entire film was produced in Super Panavision 70.)
 Star Trek: The Motion Picture (1979) – special effects shots only
 The Empire Strikes Back (1980) – selected special effects work
 Blade Runner (1982) – special effects shots only
 Brainstorm (1983) – Super Panavision 70. Virtual reality sequences only.
 Ghostbusters (1984) – special effects shots only
 2010 (1984) - Special effects shots only.
 Masters of the Universe (1987) – special effects shots only
 Die Hard (1988) – special effects shots only
 The Judas Project (1990) – special effects shots only
 Alien 3 (1992) – Panavision System 65. Special effects shots only.
 Little Buddha (1993) – Arri 765, Buddha flashback scenes only
 Contact (1997) – background plates
 Panic Room (2002) – opening title sequence.
 Spider-Man 2 (2004) – selected special effects shots only
 The New World (2005) – Panavision System 65. "Hyper-reality" scenes only.
 The Prestige (2006) – Panavision System 65. Selected wide shots only.
 Sunshine (2007) – Arri 765; "Earth Room" scene only
 The Dark Knight (2008) - selected scenes
 The International (2009) – Arri 765; selected scenes
 Stephen Hawking's Beyond the Horizon (2009) – Arri 765; dialogue scenes only
 Shutter Island (2010) - Arri 765 and Panavision System 65; certain flashback scenes
 Inception (2010) – Panavision System 65; selected scenes
 Unknown (2011) - Arri 765; selected scenes
 The Tree of Life (2011) - Panavision System 65; selected scenes
 Snow White & the Huntsman (2012) - Panavision System 65; selected wide shots and second unit work
 The Dark Knight Rises (2012) - Panavision System 65; selected scenes
 To the Wonder (2012) - selected scenes
 The Master (2012) - Panavision System 65 (approximately 85% of the film)
 Gravity (2013) - Arri 765; final scene
 Jurassic World (2015) - Panavision System 65; select scenes
 Batman v Superman: Dawn of Justice (2016) - Panavision System 65; select scenes
 Dunkirk (2017) - Panavision System 65 (non-IMAX scenes)
 Murder on the Orient Express (2017) - Panavision System 65
 Christopher Robin (2018) - Panavision System 65 and Ultra Panavision 70; select scenes
 The Nutcracker and the Four Realms (2018) - Panavision System 65
 The Death and Life of John F. Donovan (2018) - selected scenes
 Apollo 11 (2019) - Todd-AO, documentary
 Tenet (2020) - Panavision System 65 (non-IMAX scenes)
 No Time to Die (2021) - Arri 765 and Panavision System 65; some scenes
 Nope (2022) - Panavision System 65 (non-IMAX scenes)
 Oppenheimer (2023) - Panavision System 65 (non-IMAX scenes)

Soviet Bloc 70mm films 
 Povesti Plamennikh Let/Chronicle of Flaming Years (Soviet 1961) – erroneously credited as Todd-AO by some sources but shot with Soviet 70mm cameras. Optically converted to 3-strip Kinopanorama.
 Sud sumasschedshikh/The Trial of Madmen (Soviet 1962) – Sovscope 70. Optically converted to 3-strip Kinopanorama.
 Batmanova, Singing Slave (Soviet 1962) – Kinopanorama 70. Optically converted to 3-strip Kinopanorama.
 Zakon Antarktidy/The Law of the Antarctic (Soviet 1963) – Sovscope 70. Optically converted to 3-strip Kinopanorama.
 Krepostnaya Aktrisa/Serf Actress (Soviet 1963) – Sovscope 70
 Na podvodnikh skuterakh (Soviet 1963) – Kinopanorama 70. Optically converted to 3-strip Kinopanorama.
 An Optimistic Tragedy (Soviet 1963) – Sovscope 70. Optically converted to 3-strip Kinopanorama.
 Kosmicheskiy Splav/Cosmic Alloy (Soviet 1964) – Sovscope 70
 The Blizzard (Soviet 1964) - Sovscope 70
 The Enchanted Desna (Soviet 1964) – Sovscope 70
 Sekret Uspekha/Bolshoi Ballet 67 (Soviet 1964) – Sovscope 70. Optically converted to 3-strip Kinopanorama.
 SON/The Dream (Soviet 1964) – Sovscope 70
 Spyashchaya krasavitsa/The Sleeping Beauty (Soviet 1964) – Sovscope 70. Optically converted to 3-strip Kinopanorama.
 Geroy nashego vremeni/Hero of Our Time (Soviet 1965) - Sovscope 70
 God kak zhizn/A Lifetime in One Year/Year as Long as Life (Soviet 1965) – Sovscope 70
 Zalp Avrory/The Salvos of the Aurora Cruiser (Soviet 1965) - Sovscope 70
 My, Russkiy Narod/We, The Russian People (Soviet 1965) – Sovscope 70
 Yarost/Fury (Soviet 1966) – Sovscope 70
 Aybolit-66 (Soviet 1966) - Sovscope 70
 Katerina Izmailova (Soviet 1966) - Sovscope 70
 Korolevskaya regata (Soviet 1966) - Sovscope 70
 Net i da (Soviet 1966) - Stereo 70 (3D)
 The Tale of Tsar Saltan (Soviet 1966) - Sovscope 70
 Tretya molodost/La nuit des adieux/Nights of Farewell (Soviet/France 1966) - Sovscope 70
 Three Fat Men (Soviet 1966) - Sovscope 70
 Anna Karenina (Soviet 1967) - Sovscope 70
 Arena (Soviet 1967) - Sovscope 70
 Bereg Nadezhdy/The Riverside of Hope (Soviet 1967) - Sovscope 70
 Buryan (Soviet 1967) - Sovscope 70
 Torrents of Steel (Soviet 1967) - Sovscope 70
 Nezabyvayemoye/The Unforgettable (Soviet 1967) - Sovscope 70
 Wedding in Malinovka (Soviet 1967) - Sovscope 70
 Tumannost Andromedy/Andromeda Nebula (Soviet 1967) - Sovscope 70
 Vecher nakanune Ivana Kupala/The Eve of Ivan Kupalo (Soviet 1968) - Sovscope 70
 Daleko na zapade (Soviet 1968) - Sovscope 70
 Dnevnye zvyozdy/The Stars of the Day (Soviet 1968) - Sovscope 70
 War and Peace (Soviet 1966-67) – Sovscope 70
 Hauptmann Florian von der Mühle (East Germany 1968) – DEFA-70
 Ludi Na Nile/Al-nass wal Nil/Those People of the Nile (Soviet/Egypt 1968) - Sovscope 70
 Oni zhivut ryadom (Soviet 1968) - Sovscope 70
 Pervorossiyanye (Soviet 1968) - Sovscope 70
 Tainstvennyy monakh/The Mysterious Monk (Soviet 1968) - Stereo 70 (3D)
 Tchaikovsky (Soviet 1969) - Sovscope 70
 Goluboy lyod/Blue Ice (Soviet 1969) - Sovscope 70
 Direktor (Soviet 1969) - Sovscope 70
 Duma o Britanke (Soviet 1969) - Sovscope 70
 Du bist min – Ein deutsches Tagebuch (East Germany 1969) – DEFA-70
 Korol gor i drugie (Soviet 1969) - Sovscope 70
 Osvobozhdenie/Liberation (Soviet\East Germany\Poland\Italy 1969-71) - Sovscope 70
 Pochtovyy roman/Romance by Mail (Soviet 1969) - Sovscope 70
 Syuzhet dlya nebolshogo rasskaza/Subject for a Short Story (Soviet 1969) - Sovscope 70
 The Flight (Soviet 1970) - Sovscope 70
 Signale – Ein Weltraumabenteuer (East Germany/Poland 1970) – DEFA-70
 Wladimir Iljitsch Uljanow – Lenin (East Germany 1970) – DEFA-70
 Korol manezha (Soviet 1970) - Sovscope 70
 Krushenie Imperii (Soviet 1970) - Sovscope 70
 Lyubov Yarovaya (Soviet 1970) - Sovscope 70
 More v ogne (Soviet 1970) - Sovscope 70
 Chermeni/Chermain (Soviet 1970) - Sovscope 70
 Goya – oder der arge Weg der Erkenntnis (Link to German Wikipedia) (East Germany/Soviet 1971) – DEFA-70 (partly shot in Sovscope 70)
 KLK AN PTX – Die rote Kapelle (East Germany 1971) – DEFA-70
 Bilyy ptakh z chornoyu vidznakoyu/The White Bird Marked with Black (Soviet 1971) - Sovscope 70
 Zakhar Berkut (Soviet 1971) - Sovscope 70
 Zvezdy Ne Gasnut (Soviet 1971) - Sovscope 70
 Sever, yug, vostok, zapad (Vsegda Nacheku)/North, South, East, West (Soviet 1971) - Sovscope 70
 Molodye/Young People (Soviet 1971) - Sovscope 70
 Russkoye pole/Russian Field (Soviet 1971) - Sovscope 70
 Tsena bystrykh sekund (Soviet 1971) - Sovscope 70
 Blokada/Blockade (Soviet 1974-77) - Sovscope 70
 Vizit vezhlivosti/Courtesy Call (Soviet 1972) - Sovscope 70
 Vsadnik bez golovy/The Headless Rider (Soviet 1972) - Sovscope 70
 Gonshchiki/Racers (Soviet 1972) - Sovscope 70
 Eolomea (East Germany 1972) – DEFA-70
 Lützower (East Germany 1972) – DEFA-70
 Sestra Muzykanta (Soviet 1972) - Sovscope 70
 Sibiryachka/The Siberian Woman (Soviet 1972) - Sovscope 70
 Tolko ty (Soviet 1972) - Sovscope 70
 Vozvrata net/No Return (Soviet 1973) - Sovscope 70
 Vysokoye zvaniye/High Title (Soviet 1973-74) - Sovscope 70
 Goroda i gody/Towns and Years (Soviet 1973) - Sovscope 70
 Much Ado About Nothing (Soviet 1973) - Sovscope 70
 Orpheus in der Unterwelt (East Germany 1974) – DEFA-70
 Avtomobil, skripka i sobaka Klyaksa/A Car, a Violin and a Dog-Spot (Soviet 1974) - Sovscope 70
 Romans o vlyublyonnykh/A Lover's Romance (Soviet 1974) - Sovscope 70
 Samyy zharkiy mesyats/The Warmest Month (Soviet 1974) - Sovscope 70
 Belyy bashlyk (Soviet 1975) - Sovscope 70
 Dersu Uzala (Soviet 1975) – Sovscope 70
 Vozdukhoplavatel/The Balloonist (Soviet 1975) - Sovscope 70
 Ot zari do zari/From Dawn Till Sunset (Soviet 1975) - Sovscope 70
 Semya Ivanovykh/The Ivanov Family (Soviet 1975) - Sovscope 70
 Gypsies Are Found Near Heaven (Soviet 1975) - Sovscope 70
 Kafe 'Izotop (Soviet 1976) - Sovscope 70
 Teatr Neizvestnogo Aktera (Soviet 1976) - Sovscope 70
 Vooruzhyon i ochen opasen/Armed and Very Dangerous (Soviet 1977) - Sovscope 70
 Incognito from St. Petersburg (Soviet 1977) - Sovscope 70
 Pravo na lyubov (Soviet 1977) - Sovscope 70
 Soldaty Svobody/Soldiers of Freedom (Soviet/Poland/Czechoslovakia/East Germany/Bulgaria/Hungary/Romania 1977) - Sovscope 70
 Solntse, snova solntse (Soviet 1977) - Sovscope 70
 SOS nad taygoy/SOS from the Taiga (Soviet 1977) - Stereo 70 (3D)
 Sudba/Destiny (Soviet 1977) - Sovscope 70
 Front za liniey fronta/Front Beyond the Front Line (Soviet 1977) - Sovscope 70
 Chyornaya beryoza/The Black Birch (Soviet 1978) - Sovscope 70
 Vsyo reshayet mgnoveniye/A Moment Decides Everything (Soviet 1978) - Sovscope 70
 Yemelyan Pugachyov (Soviet 1978) - Sovscope 70
 Zamurovannye v stekle (Soviet 1978) - Stereo 70 (3D)
 Zhnecy (Soviet 1978) - Sovscope 70
 Pogovorim, brat/Talk with Me, Brother (Soviet 1978) - Sovscope 70
 Poka bezumstvuyet mechta/While the Dream Is Raving (Soviet 1978) - Sovscope 70
 Yaroslavna, koroleva Frantsii/Yaroslavna, Queen of France (Soviet 1978) - Sovscope 70
 Veroy i pravdoy/With Faith and Truth (Soviet 1979) - Sovscope 70
 Takeoff (Soviet 1979) - Sovscope 70
 Vkus khleba (Soviet 1979) - Sovscope 70
 Zabudte slovo 'smert'/Forget the Word 'Death''' (Soviet 1979) - Sovscope 70
 Zdes, na moey zemle/Here, at My Land (Soviet 1979) - Sovscope 70
 Krutoe Pole (Soviet 1979) - Sovscope 70
 Poslednyaya okhota/The Last Hunt (Soviet 1979) - Sovscope 70
 Eskadron gusar letuchikh (Soviet 1980) - Sovscope 70
 Koney na pereprave ne menyayut/Horses Aren't Changed at the Crossing (Soviet 1980) - Sovscope 70
 Les (Soviet 1980/1987) - Sovscope 70
 Fantaziya na temu lyubvi (Soviet 1980) - Sovscope 70
 Vsadnik na zolotom kone (Soviet 1980) - Stereo 70 (3D)
 Express on Fire (Soviet 1981) - Sovscope 70
 Cherez ternii k zvyozdam/To the Stars by Hard Ways (Soviet 1981) - Sovscope 70
 Devushka i Grand (Soviet 1981) - Sovscope 70
 Dusha (Soviet 1981) - Sovscope 70
 Lesnaya pesnya. Mavka/A Story of the Forest: Mavka (Soviet 1981) - Sovscope 70
 Pokhishcheniye veka/Kidnapping of the Century (Soviet 1981) - Stereo 70 (3D)
 Shlyapa/The Hat (Soviet 1981) - Sovscope 70
 Yaroslav Mudry (Soviet 1981) - Sovscope 70
 Zvezda i smert Khoakina Muryety (Soviet 1982) - Sovscope 70
 Vasili Buslayev (Soviet 1982) - Sovscope 70
 Vishnyovyy omut/Cherry Whirlpool (Soviet 1982) - Sovscope 70
 Vladivostok, god 1918 (Soviet 1982) - Sovscope 70
 Vysokyi Pereval (Soviet 1982) - Sovscope 70
 Yesli vrag ne sdayotsya.../If the Enemy Doesn't Surrender... (Soviet 1982) - Sovscope 70
 Oslinaya shkura/Donkey's Hide (Soviet 1982) - Sovscope 70
 Predisloviye k bitve (Soviet 1982) - Sovscope 70
 Tayny svyatogo Yura (Soviet 1982) - Sovscope 70
 Front v tylu vraga/Front in the Rear of the Enemy (Soviet/Czechoslovakia 1982) - Sovscope 70
 Ekzamen na bessmertie (Soviet 1983) - Sovscope 70
 Legenda o knyagine Olge/The Legend of Princess Olga (Soviet 1983) - Sovscope 70
 Na ves zolota (Soviet 1983) - Sovscope 70
 O strannostyakh lyubvi/About Oddities of Love (Soviet 1983) - Stereo 70 (3D)
 Retsept yeyo molodosti/Recipe of Her Youth (Soviet 1983) - Sovscope 70
 Skorost/Speed (Soviet 1983) - Sovscope 70
 Uchenik lekarya/The Doctor's Pupil (Soviet 1983) - Stereo 70 (3D)
 Blistayushchiy mir/The Sparkling World (Soviet 1984) - Sovscope 70
 Geroy eyo romana/Hero of Her Romance (Soviet 1984) - Sovscope 70
 I vot prishyol Bumbo.../And Then Came Bumbo... (Soviet 1984) - Sovscope 70
 I eshchyo odna noch Shekherazady/And Another Shererazade Night (Soviet 1984) - Sovscope 70
 Pervaya konnaya/First Cavalry (Soviet 1984) - Sovscope 70
 Poruchit generalu Nesterovu (Soviet 1984) - Sovscope 70
 Prikhodi svobodnym (Soviet 1984) - Sovscope 70
 Sem stikhiy (Soviet 1984) - Sovscope 70
 Shutki v storonu (Soviet 1984) - Stereo 70 (3D)
 Bitva za Moskvu/The Fight for Moscow (Soviet/Czechoslovakia/East Germany/Hungary 1985) - Sovscope 70
 Chyornaya strela/The Black Arrow (Soviet 1985) - Sovscope 70
 Zhil otvazhnyy kapitan (Soviet 1985) - Sovscope 70
 Matveeva radost (Soviet 1985) - Sovscope 70
 Pryzhok (Soviet 1985) - Sovscope 70
 Sopernitsy (Soviet 1985) - Sovscope 70
 Kapitan 'Piligrima (Soviet 1986) - Sovscope 70
 Mama, rodnaya, lyubimaya... (Soviet 1986) - Sovscope 70
 Na zlatom kryltse sideli/Sitting on the Golden Porch (Soviet 1986) - Stereo 70 (3D)
 Perekhvat/Interception (Soviet 1986) - Sovscope 70
 Postaraysya ostatsya zhivym (Soviet 1986) - Sovscope 70
 Prodelki v starinnom dukhe/Old Times Pranks (Soviet 1986) - Sovscope 70
 Breakthrough (Soviet 1986) - Sovscope 70
 Rus iznachalnaya/Primary Russia (Soviet 1986) - Sovscope 70
 Stepnaya eskadrilya (Soviet 1986) - Sovscope 70
 Tam, gde nas net (Soviet 1986) - Sovscope 70
 Bayka (Soviet 1987) - Sovscope 70
 Ivan Veliky (Soviet 1987) - Sovscope 70
 Oglasheniyu ne podlezhit (Soviet 1987) - Sovscope 70
 She with a Broom, He in a Black Hat (Soviet 1987) - Stereo 70 (3D)
 Serebryanye struny (Soviet 1987) - Sovscope 70
 Skazka pro vlyublyonnogo malyara (Soviet 1987) - Sovscope 70
 Sledopyt/The Pathfinder (Soviet 1987) - Sovscope 70
 Tsyganka Aza (Soviet 1987) - Sovscope 70
 Bez mundira (Soviet 1988) - Sovscope 70
 Na pomoshch, bratsy! (Soviet 1988) - Sovscope 70
 Raz, dva - gore ne beda (Soviet 1988) - Sovscope 70
 Fantasticheskaya istoriya (Soviet 1988) - Sovscope 70
 Cyrano de Bergerac (Soviet 1989) - Sovscope 70
 Kamennaya dusha (Soviet 1989) - Sovscope 70
 Suvenir dlya prokurora (Soviet 1989) - Stereo 70 (3D)
 Vanka-vstanka (Soviet 1990) - Stereo 70 (3D)
 Vlyublyonnyy maneken/The Model Who Fell in Love (Soviet 1991) - Stereo 70 (3D)
 Rys idet po sledu'' (Russia 1994) - Stereo 70 (3D)

See also
 List of IMAX films
 70 mm film
 List of early wide-gauge films
 70 mm Grandeur film
 Cinerama
 Kinopanorama
 List of film formats
 Super Panavision 70
 Super Technirama 70
 Todd-AO
 Ultra Panavision 70

External links
 Dream Journeys: The M.C.S.-70 Process and European Cinema of the 1960s http://www.in70mm.com/news/2009/mcs_70/english/index.htm
 List of films in SovScope

References

70 mm
70 mm film